Sir Edward John Bunting  (13 August 19182 May 1995) was an Australian public servant and diplomat, whose senior career appointments included Australian High Commissioner to the United Kingdom and Secretary of the Department of the Prime Minister and Cabinet.

Biography
Bunting was born in Ballarat, Victoria, and educated at the Trinity Grammar School. In 1937 he entered residence at Trinity College (University of Melbourne), where he played cricket and football, graduating in 1938 with a Bachelor of Arts (honours). Bunting was one of four graduates accepted into the Commonwealth Public Service in 1940, accepting a posting in Canberra within the Department of Trade and Customs and later, the Department of Post-war Reconstruction. After a short posting overseas, Bunting became a member of the Sydney-based Inter-Departmental Dollar Committee, which dealt with the allocation of dollars for imports.

In 1950 he was appointed to the Prime Minister's Department as an assistant secretary and later returned to London as Official Secretary at Australia House. Back in Canberra, Bunting was appointed deputy secretary in the Prime Minister's Department and appointed as Secretary to that department in 1959, a position he continued to hold until 1968, and served successive prime ministers Sir Robert Menzies, Harold Holt, and John McEwen. Within days of John Gorton becoming Prime Minister, Bunting was sidelined as Secretary to the newly formed Department of the Cabinet Office and was replaced by Lenox Hewitt as Secretary to the Prime Minister's Department. On taking office as Prime Minister in 1971, William McMahon reversed Gorton's changes and restored Bunting to the pre-eminent position as Secretary to the newly formed Department of the Prime Minister and Cabinet. Hewitt accepted appointment to the lesser role of Secretary to the Department of the Vice-President of the Executive Council. Bunting provided advice to incoming Prime Minister Gough Whitlam on the transition to government; with Whitlam later opining of Bunting:
(His) loyalty, integrity, diligence and dedication have made him a leader and example among all public servants.

Bunting was appointed to serve as High Commissioner in London, with effect from 1 February 1975. Suffering a heart attack whilst in Dundee in February 1976, Bunting returned to Australia in 1977, unable to complete his full term as High Commissioner.

Upon his return to Australia, Bunting was appointed as a consultant to the Office of National Assessments. A close confidant of Robert Menzies during and after his Prime Ministerial career, in 1978 Bunting was appointed as the inaugural National Coordinator of the Sir Robert Menzies Memorial Foundation. In 1988, Bunting authored a biography of Robert Menzies, entitled R. G. Menzies: a portrait.

Bunting died in Sydney on 2 May 1995, aged 77, survived by Lady Bunting and their three sons.

Honours
In 1953 Bunting was appointed an Officer of the Order of the British Empire; and upgraded to a Commander of the Order in 1961. Knighted as a Knight Bachelor in 1964; and appointed a Knight Commander of the Order of the British Empire in 1977. In 1982 Bunting was appointed a Companion of the Order of Australia in recognition for public and community service.

References

Further reading
 

1918 births
1995 deaths
People educated at Trinity Grammar School, Kew
People educated at Trinity College (University of Melbourne)
Australian Knights Bachelor
Australian Knights Commander of the Order of the British Empire
Companions of the Order of Australia
Secretaries of the Department of the Prime Minister and Cabinet
Secretaries of the Australian Government Education Department
High Commissioners of Australia to the United Kingdom
Permanent Representatives of Australia to the International Maritime Organization
20th-century Australian public servants